Nikola Janković (born 7 June 1993) is a Serbian professional footballer who plays a right-back.

Career statistics

Club

Statistics accurate as of 8 December 2016

Honours
Čukarički
Serbian Cup: 2014–15

References

External links
 Stats at utakmica.rs 

1993 births
Living people
Association football fullbacks
Serbian footballers
Serbian expatriate footballers
FK Kolubara players
FK Čukarički players
Serbian First League players
Serbian SuperLiga players
Premier League of Bosnia and Herzegovina players
Serbian expatriate sportspeople in Slovenia
Expatriate footballers in Slovenia
Serbian expatriate sportspeople in the Czech Republic
Expatriate footballers in the Czech Republic
Serbian expatriate sportspeople in Bosnia and Herzegovina
Expatriate footballers in Bosnia and Herzegovina
NK Krško players
FK Jablonec players
FK Inđija players
FK Zvijezda 09 players